Hardcore Lives is the eighth studio album by New York hardcore band Madball. It was released on June 27, 2014. This was the last album to feature guitarist Brian "Mitts" Daniels before his departure.

Background and history
On March 10, 2014, it was announced that Madball had entered the studio to begin recording their upcoming eighth studio album, which was scheduled for a mid-summer release. The band announced they were recording tracks with Ken Susi at System Recordings in Grafton, Massachusetts, and that additional recording would take place at Pinecrust Studios in Miami, Florida, with Jonathan Nuñez. Also, the album would be mixed by Chris "Zeuss" Harris, who previously worked with the band on their 2005 album Legacy and their 2007 album Infiltrate the System.

On April 11, it was announced that the title of the upcoming album was Hardcore Lives, and that it would be released on June 27, 2014. Vocalist Freddy Cricien commented on the album title, saying:

On April 25, a lyric video for the song "DNA" was released. On April 30, an in-studio trailer was released.

Track listing

Credits
Madball
 Freddy Cricien – vocals
 Hoya Roc – bass
 Mitts – guitars
 Mike Justian – drums

Additional musicians
Scott Vogel – guest vocals on "True School"
Candace Puopolo – guest vocals on "Born Strong"
Toby Morse – guest vocals on "My Armor"
Chad Gilbert – backing vocals on "My Armor
CM Punk – backing vocals on "My Armor"

Production
 Ken Susi – recording, tracking, engineering
 Jonathan Nuñez – recording
 Chris "Zeuss" Harris – mixing, mastering

References

2014 albums
Madball albums